Earl Winfield (born August 6, 1961) is a former Canadian Football League receiver for the Hamilton Tiger-Cats who, in an 11-year career from 1987-1997, caught 573 passes for 10,119 yards and 75 touchdowns.

Winfield played college football at the University of North Carolina at Chapel Hill from 1982 to 1985.  He left as the all-time Tar Heel career leader in receptions, with 107.

On February 21, 2013 the Canadian Football Hall of Fame announced that Winfield would be inducted as a player at a ceremony in Edmonton in September, 2013.

External links
 Earl Winfield: Stats & Profile
 Does Earl Winfield belong in the Canadian Football Hall of Fame?

1961 births
Living people
American players of Canadian football
Canadian football wide receivers
Hamilton Tiger-Cats players
North Carolina Tar Heels football players
Sportspeople from Petersburg, Virginia
Canadian Football Hall of Fame inductees